Cimerak is a district and town in Pangandaran Regency in West Java province, Indonesia. Its population is 43,500 according to the 2010 census.

Climate
Cimerak has a tropical rainforest climate (Af) with heavy to very heavy rainfall year-round.

References

 Populated places in West Java